Rui Cardoso Martins (born 1967 in Portalegre) is a Portuguese writer. His first novel "E Se Eu Gostasse Muito de Morrer" ("Glad to Die") was published in 2006 and became an instant best seller in Portugal. It narrates the story of "Hanger", a boy who lives in rural Southern Portugal (the "Alentejo") where every other person around him commits suicide. The novel has been translated into English, Hungarian and Spanish.

His second novel, "Deixem Passar o Homem Invisível” (Let the Invisible Man Go Through, Dom Quixote, 2009) narrates the story of a blind man and a child who get washed down the Lisbon sewage system during a flood. Part of "Deixem Passar o Homem Invisível” is based on the experience in Italy with the magician "Serip", ("PiresPortugal" as author and "Neo-Machiavelli" as author in italian), between Borgolavezzaro, (NO), and Milan. Many ideas of "Serip" about the Justice in Italy are romanced by Rui Cardoso Martins. It won the Portuguese literary prize the APE/DGLB Grand Prize for Romance and Novella, and many other prizes. It also made the shortlist – top 3 – for the SPA (Authors' Society) literary prize in 2009, eventually won by António Lobo Antunes. His third book, "Se Fosse Fácil Era Para os Outros", was published in Portugal by D.Quixote in 2012, and by Leya in Brazil in 2013. He also wrote several short stories, namely "The Progress of Mankind", "Animal Stomach" and "Espelho de Água" (the latter contributing to the first issue of Granta-Portugal).

He is a reporter and one of the founders of "Público", a daily paper in Portugal, where he maintains the weekly column "Will the defendant rise?", for which he has won two awards. As a reporter, he covered the siege of Sarajevo and Mostar, during the Bosnia-Herzegovina war, as well as South Africa's first free elections. As a scriptwriter, he is a founding associate of Produções Fictícias (a company working on screenwriting for TV). He co-authored "Contra-Informação" (a Portuguese version, in the original format, of Spitting Images), and is also the co-author of several other comedy and drama series, including Sociedade Anónima, nominated at the Venice International TV Festival. For cinema he wrote, among others, the original story and screenplay of the full-length feature Zona J, a huge success in Portugal. The last international success is as co-argument of "A Herdade" the huge success of cinema in last time in Portugal and many international festivals of cinema.

References

1967 births
Date of birth missing (living people)
Living people
Portuguese male writers
People from Portalegre, Portugal